Benedikt Fernandez (born 8 January 1985) is a German football goalkeeper.

Club career
Born in Bonn, Fernandez joined Bayer Leverkusen's youth academy in 2000 and started playing for the club's reserve team in 2005. In 2006, he signed a professional contract with the club to play understudy to Hans-Jörg Butt and René Adler. He made his Bundesliga debut on 10 February 2007 against Eintracht Frankfurt, coming on as a substitute following a red card to Hans-Jörg Butt. He made one more appearance in the Bundesliga that season before being replaced by René Adler, who went on to establish himself as the club's first-choice goalkeeper.

Following the departure of Hans-Jörg Butt in the summer of 2007, Fernandez became the second-choice goalkeeper in Leverkusen's first team, also continuing to occasionally play for the reserves. His first appearance for the first team in the 2007–08 season was his UEFA Cup debut against FC Zürich on 19 December 2007. He only made two further appearances with the first team thereafter, one in the Bundesliga and one in the UEFA Cup, deputising for the injured Adler in late February 2008.

Due to another injury to Adler, Leverkusen started their 2008–09 Bundesliga campaign with Fernandez in goal, with him subsequently making further three Bundesliga appearances before Adler returned to action in mid-September 2008. At the end of the 2010–11 season, he left Bayer Leverkusen. After a year without a club, he signed for 1. FC Saarbrücken in 2012.

Personal life
Fernandez is of Spanish descent through his father.

Career statistics

1.Includes Promotion Playoff.

References

External links
 
 

Living people
1985 births
Sportspeople from Bonn
Association football goalkeepers
German footballers
German people of Spanish descent
Bayer 04 Leverkusen players
Bayer 04 Leverkusen II players
1. FC Saarbrücken players
Sportfreunde Lotte players
Bundesliga players
3. Liga players
Footballers from North Rhine-Westphalia